Açu (or Assu) is a municipality (município) in the state of Rio Grande do Norte in Brazil. The population is 58,384 (2020 est.) in an area of 1303 km². 

The municipality contains the Açu National Forest, a  sustainable use conservation unit that was originally established as a forest park in 1950.
The Barragem Armando Ribeiro Gonçalves, a reservoir on the Piranhas River, is partly located in the municipality.

References

External links
Rio Grande do Norte - Açu
Homepage of Açu

Municipalities in Rio Grande do Norte